Nadine Sierra (born May 14, 1988) is an American soprano. She is most well known for her interpretation of Gilda in Verdi's Rigoletto, and Lucia in Donizetti's Lucia di Lammermoor. Currently performing in leading roles in the top opera houses around the world, she received the 1st Prize and People's Choice Award 2013 at the Neue Stimmen competition, is the 2017 Richard Tucker Music Foundation Award Winner, and was awarded the Beverly Sills Artists Award in 2018. Her debut album on the Universal Music Group label, There's a Place for Us, was released on August 24, 2018.

Biography 

A native of Fort Lauderdale, Florida, she trained at The Mannes College of Music and with Marilyn Horne at the Music Academy of the West, where she was the youngest person ever to win the Marilyn Horne Foundation Vocal Competition. She became a Young Artist with the Palm Beach Opera when she was 14 and made her operatic debut there two years later as the Sandman in Engelbert Humperdinck's Hansel and Gretel. She also appeared on the National Public Radio program From the Top when she was 15 performing "O mio babbino caro" from Gianni Schicchi.

She was invited back to From the Top in 2010, a show taped in Burlington, Vermont, with commentary by Marilyn Horne. She appeared at the United States Supreme Court Building in May 2009 where she sang solo and with Thomas Hampson in the Justices Chambers. In 2009 she competed in Helsinki, Finland, in the Mirjam Helin International Competition where she was awarded second place. She had her debut concert in Helsinki, Finland in 2009. In October 2009 she performed in the Marilyn Horne Mediterranean Cruise to Italy, Croatia, Turkey and Greece. In March 2010 she performed at the Musashino Hall, Tokyo, Japan.

Sierra appeared as the Princess with Gotham Chamber Opera's production of Xavier Montsalvatge's opera El gato con botas at the New Victory Theater. In January 2011 she returned to Palm Beach Opera's Orfeo ed Euridice in the title role. In May 2011 she appeared as Tytania in Boston Lyric Opera's A Midsummer Night's Dream. In January 2011, Sierra became a San Francisco Opera Adler Fellow  and the following May appeared in the company's premiere of Christopher Theofanidis' opera Heart of a Soldier with Thomas Hampson in the main role. In January 2012 she appeared as Gilda in Florida Grand Opera's Rigoletto and in 2013 at Teatro San Carlo in Naples in the same role. 

Sierra is featured in the book Driven: Six Incredible Musical Journeys in which author Nick Romeo devoted one of the chapters ("Journeys") to her.

In January 2016, she performed at Venice New Year's Concert with Stefano Secco and at Milan's fabled La Scala as Gilda in Rigoletto with Leo Nucci. In January 2017 she sang in the New Year's Concert at Palermo's Teatro Massimo, followed in March by six performances as Ilia in Mozart's Idomeneo at the Metropolitan Opera in New York. In January 2019 she sang in the New Year's Concert at Venice's Teatro La Fenice.

In 2017, she was named the year's Richard Tucker Music Foundation Award Winner, and performed to great critical acclaim at the December 10th Gala. Sierra performed in the Concert de Paris under the Eiffel Tower in July 2017. Her 2017/2018 highlights include: Susanna in Mozart's Le Nozze di Figaro at The Metropolitan Opera, solo recitals in Dallas and New York City, a tour with Andrea Bocelli, Nannetta in Verdi's Falstaff at the Staatsoper Berlin, and Norina in Don Pasquale at the Opéra National de Paris. In 2018, she was named the Beverly Sills Artist Award Winner in a ceremony held at the Metropolitan Opera.

She is a Universal Music Group artist with a solo album, There's a Place for Us, which was released August 24, 2018 on Deutsche Grammophon. In 2022, her Violetta in the Metropolitan Opera production of La Traviata was hailed as showing Sierra's "innate sense of style and line that recalls Italian sopranos of the past, with decadent rubatos that fall on just the right side of indulgence."

Awards

Sierra has been awarded the following awards and scholarships:
 National Foundation for Advancement in the Arts, Miami, Florida – Vocal Silver Award 2006
 Palm Beach Opera Vocal Competition, West Palm Beach, Florida – First Place Junior Division 2007
The Marilyn Horne Foundation Vocal Competition, Santa Barbara, California – First Place Award 2007
 National Society for Arts and Letters Vocal Competition, Bloomington, Indiana – Second Place Award 2008
 The Metropolitan Opera National Council Auditions, New York City – Grand Finalist Winner 2009
 Florida Grand Opera Competition, Miami, Florida – Junior Division First Place Award 2009
Licia Albanese–Puccini International Competition, New York, NY – Third Place Award 2009
 Gerda Lissner Foundation Competition, New York City – First Place 2010
 Richard Tucker Foundation, New York City – 2010 Sara Tucker Study Award Winner
 George London Foundation Competition, New York City First Place 2010
 Loren Zachary Foundation International Competition, Los Angeles, California – First Place 2010
 The Leonore Annenberg Award Fellowship in the Performing Arts, 2011
 Stella Maris International Music Competition 2011, Audience Prize
 The Veronica Dunne International Singing Competition, Dublin, 2013
 Neue Stimmen, Gütersloh, Germany – 1st Prize and People's Choice Award 2013
 Richard Tucker Music Foundation Award Winner, 2017
 Beverly Sills Artists Award Winner, 2018

Recordings 
 Made for Opera, 2022, Deutsche Grammophon
 Rigoletto, 2017, Delos 
 There's a Place for Us, 2018, Deutsche Grammophon

References

External links
Management: GM Art & Music
Marilyn Horne Foundation, Biography: Nadine Sierra
Mallozzi, Vincent M., "Young Singers Await Their Big Moment at the Met", The New York Times, February 21, 2009
Christensen, Thor, "Opera star Nadine Sierra on being bullied, fighting stigma and the VHS tape that changed her life," January 24t, 2018
Goodwin, Jay, "Meet the Young Soprano Wowing Met Opera Audiences in Le Nozze di Figaro" January 12, 2018

1988 births
Living people
Musicians from Fort Lauderdale, Florida
Richard Tucker Award winners
Winners of the Metropolitan Opera National Council Auditions
Singers from Florida
American operatic sopranos
21st-century American  women opera singers
Mannes School of Music alumni
Music Academy of the West alumni
Marilyn Horne Song Competition winners